The Houston Rockets are an American professional basketball team based in Houston, Texas. They are a member of the Southwest Division of the Western Conference in the National Basketball Association (NBA). They have played their home games at Toyota Center since 2003. Founded by Robert Breitbard in San Diego, the team first joined the NBA in 1967 as an expansion team. After four losing seasons, however, the team was sold to a group of investors based in Houston. The group subsequently relocated the team to Houston, where the Rockets have remained for 37 seasons. The franchise won its only two NBA titles in 1994 and 1995.

There have been 15 head coaches for the Houston Rockets franchise. Jack McMahon, the team's first head coach, compiled a 61–129 record during his tenure. Rudy Tomjanovich, who led the Rockets to their two championships, is the franchise's all-time leader in both regular-season and playoff games coached and wins. Alex Hannum, Tex Winter, Kevin McHale, Bill Fitch, Rudy Tomjanovich and Rick Adelman  have been enshrined in the Naismith Memorial Basketball Hall of Fame. Tom Nissalke, Don Chaney and Mike D'Antoni were named Coach of the Year during their tenures as head coaches. Both Tex Winter and Johnny Egan have spent their entire NBA head coaching careers with the Rockets. Egan, Tomjanovich, and Rick Adelman formerly played for the Rockets.

Key

Coaches

Notes
A running total of the number of coaches of the Rockets. Thus, any coach who has two or more separate terms as head coach is only counted once.
Each year is linked to an article about that particular NBA season.

References
General

Specific

Lists of National Basketball Association head coaches by team

Head coaches